The 2018 Copa do Brasil second stage was the second stage of the 2018 Copa do Brasil football competition. It was played from 14 to 22 February 2018. A total of 40 teams competed in the second stage to decide twenty places in the third stage of the 2018 Copa do Brasil.

Format
In the second stage, each tie was played on a single match basis. If tied, extra time would not be played and the penalty shoot-out would be used to determine the winner. Host teams were settled in the first-stage draw.

Matches
All times are Brasília time, BRT (UTC−2 before 18 Feb. and UTC−3 after 18 Feb.)

|}

Match 41

Match 42

Match 43

Match 44

Match 45

Match 46

Match 47

Match 48

Match 49

Match 50

Match 51

Match 52

Match 53

Match 54

Match 55

Match 56

Match 57

Match 58

Match 59

Match 60

References

2018 Copa do Brasil